Brewood and Coven is a civil parish in the district of South Staffordshire, Staffordshire, England. It contains 137 listed buildings that are recorded in the National Heritage List for England. Of these, three are listed at Grade I, the highest of the three grades, eleven are at Grade II*, the middle grade, and the others are at Grade II, the lowest grade. The parish contains the villages of Brewood, Coven, and Bishops Wood and the surrounding area. In the parish are three country houses, which are listed together with buildings in their grounds and estates. Two canals run through the parish, the Shropshire Union Canal and the Staffordshire and Worcestershire Canal, and the listed buildings associated with these are bridges, mileposts, and an aqueduct. Most of the other listed buildings are houses and associated structures, cottages, farmhouses, farm buildings, shops and offices, the earlier of which are timber framed or have timber framed cores. The other listed buildings include churches and associated structures, monuments in a churchyard, a holy well, road bridges, a public house, a war memorial, and a telephone kiosk.


Key

Buildings

Notes and references

Notes

Citations

Sources

Lists of listed buildings in Staffordshire
South Staffordshire District